Adel Township is a township in Dallas County, Iowa, USA.  As of the 2000 census, its population was 5,664.

Geography
According to the USGS, it contains nine cemeteries: Dallas County Farm, Gibson, King, Kinnick, Masonic, Merical, Miller, Oakdale and Odd Fellows.

The streams of Hickory Creek and Mill Slough run through this township.

Transportation
Adel Township contains one airport or landing strip, Husband Field.

Churches
Minutes of the Council Meeting held by the Brethren of the Panther Creek Church, Dallas County, Iowa. ORGANIZATION OF THE CHURCH OF THE BRETHREN IN DALLAS COUNTY
     During the fall of the year 1869 a number of families of the Brethren from the different churches of Northern Illinois moved to this (Dallas) County, Iowa. Sometime in the month of November of the year above named, the brothers and sisters that moved here, with those that lived here previous to that time, assembled at the house of Bro. Henry Stitzel in the city of Adel where an organization of the church was affected and called the Panther Creek Church ..."

References

 USGS Geographic Names Information System (GNIS)

External links
 US-Counties.com
 City-Data.com

Townships in Dallas County, Iowa
Townships in Iowa